Boston Run is an unincorporated community and former coal town known as Suffolk in Schuylkill County, Pennsylvania, United States.

References

External links
Coal Region

Unincorporated communities in Schuylkill County, Pennsylvania
Coal towns in Pennsylvania
Unincorporated communities in Pennsylvania